is a former Japanese football player.

Playing career
Okamura was born in Nagasaki Prefecture on March 21, 1977. After graduating from Kansai University, he joined J1 League club Gamba Osaka in 1999. On May 24, 2000, he debuted as midfielder against Consadole Sapporo in J.League Cup. However he could hardly play in the match until 2001. In 2002, he moved to newly was promoted to Japan Football League club, Sagawa Express Osaka. He played many matches in 3 seasons. He retired end of 2004 season.

Club statistics

References

External links

1977 births
Living people
Kansai University alumni
Association football people from Nagasaki Prefecture
Japanese footballers
J1 League players
Japan Football League players
Gamba Osaka players
Sagawa Shiga FC players
Association football midfielders